The proposed International Criminal Tribunal for the Russian Federation is a proposed ad hoc international criminal tribunal aimed at prosecuting the Russian Federation and senior Russian and Belarusian leaders for the Russian invasions of Ukraine as one or more crimes of aggression, as a complement to the existing International Criminal Court investigation in Ukraine. Several international bodies announced their support for its establishment, including the Council of Europe, the European Commission, the NATO Parliamentary Assembly and the European Parliament.

Proposals
In April 2022 the Parliamentary Assembly of the Council of Europe (PACE) called for an ad hoc international criminal tribunal. In September 2022, the Council of Europe proposed to create a tribunal that would have a mandate to "investigate and prosecute the crime of aggression" committed by "the political and military leadership of the Russian Federation." Under the Council of Europe's proposal, the tribunal should be located in Strasbourg, "apply the definition of the crime of aggression" established in customary international law and "have the power to issue international arrest warrants and not be limited by State immunity or the immunity of heads of State and government and other State officials."

The government of Ukraine has also called for the establishment of such a tribunal.

In November 2022 the NATO Parliamentary Assembly designated the Russian Federation as a terrorist organization and called upon the international community to "to take collective action towards the establishment of an international tribunal to prosecute the crime of aggression committed by Russia with its war against Ukraine." The European Commission said that the European Union (EU) would work to establish an ad hoc criminal tribunal to investigate and prosecute Russia's crime of aggression. In the same month the European Parliament also designated Russia as a state sponsor of terrorism, citing attacks against civilians, war crimes, and atrocities.

On 19 January 2023, the European Parliament called for the creation of an international tribunal to carry out investigations and prosecutions for Russian and Belarusian responsibility for the crime of aggression, complementary to the International Criminal Court investigation in Ukraine. The vote passed with 472 votes in favour, 19 against and 33 abstentions. On 4 March 2023 the European Union (EU) agreed to establish an International Centre for the Prosecution of Crimes Aggression against Ukraine (ICPA) to fill in any gaps in prosecution from the International Criminal Court (ICC) as Russia had rejected the ICC jurisdiction to prosecute a case of aggression as neither Ukraine nor Russia ratified the 2010 ICC Kampala Amendments on "aggression" being added to the existing three grave international crimes, namely war crimes, crimes against humanity and genocide.

Core group
In late February 2023, Ukrainian foreign minister Dmytro Kuleba stated that a "core group" for creating the tribunal existed, including representation from Guatemala.

Countries supporting the creation of the tribunal 
{{columns-list|colwidth=12em|
  Australia 
  Austria
  Czech Republic <ref name="iba1">

Other political bodies
  (European Parliament) 
 ’s Parliamentary Assembly 
 Parliamentary Assembly of the Council of Europe 
 Parliamentary Assembly of the Organization for Security and Co-operation in Europe

See also 
Legality of the 2022 Russian invasion of Ukraine
War crimes in the 2022 Russian invasion of Ukraine

References

2022 in law
International criminal law
International courts and tribunals
Crimes against humanity
War crimes organizations
Reactions to the 2022 Russian invasion of Ukraine
Russian war crimes in Ukraine
Genocide